A list of films produced in Italy in 1951 (see 1951 in film):

List of films (in alphabetical order)

A

B–D

E–L

M–Q

S–Z

Notes

External links
 Italian films of 1951 at the Internet Movie Database

Films
Italian
1951